Adam Eaton may refer to:
Adam Eaton (pitcher) (born 1977), American baseball pitcher
Adam Eaton (outfielder) (born 1988), American baseball outfielder
Adam Eaton (footballer) (born 1980), English footballer